is a Japanese former Nippon Professional Baseball pitcher.

References 

1971 births
Living people
Baseball people from Ehime Prefecture 
Japanese baseball players
Nippon Professional Baseball pitchers
Yakult Swallows players
Tokyo Yakult Swallows players
Japanese baseball coaches
Nippon Professional Baseball coaches